The 7.5 cm Gebirgskanone Model 1911 was a mountain gun manufactured for export in 1911 by the German firm Rheinmetall. Nine batteries were sold to Norway. During the 1940 Norwegian campaign, a number of these were captured by the Germans, who designated them 7.5 cm GebK 247(n). The crew were protected by an armoured shield.

See also
List of mountain artillery

Notes

75 mm artillery
World War II mountain artillery
World War II artillery of Norway
World War II artillery of Germany